Milestone is the second studio album from Gideon. Facedown Records released the album on July 3, 2012. Gideon worked with Brian Hood in the production of this album.

Critical reception

Awarding this album three stars from HM Magazine, Tim Hallila states, "A refreshingly tight sound". Gareth Hills, rating the album an eight out of ten for Cross Rhythms, writes, "an album which doesn't give up in its passion, energy and rawness, and an example of a Christian metal band doing it right." Giving the album four stars at Jesus Freak Hideout, Scott Fryberger describes, "Milestone shows that Facedown Records still has game."

Steven Cosand, awarding the album five stars from Indie Vision Music, says, "There is something so youthful and refreshing about this band. Milestone stands out lyrically and musically in comparison to recent releases from both secular and Christian bands. Listening to Milestone is like a breath of fresh air. Gideon is hands down the band that has renewed my faith in Christian hardcore." Rating the album an eight out of ten by The Christian Music Review Blog, Jonathan Kemp writes, "It shows great maturity by the band, and is impeccably well done for a sophomore album."

Track listing

Personnel 

Gideon
 Daniel McWhorter – vocals
 Daniel McCartney – lead guitar, vocals
 Tyler Riley – rhythm guitar, vocals
 Timothy Naugher – bass
 Jake Smelley – drums

Additional musicians
 Matt Honeycutt – guest vocals on "Still Alive"
 Justice Tripp – guest vocals on "Maternity"

Charts

References

2012 albums
Facedown Records albums
Gideon (band) albums